Angelo Baroni (1553 – November 1612) was a Roman Catholic prelate who served as Bishop of Chioggia (1611–1612) and Bishop of Kotor (1604–1611).

Biography
Angelo Baroni was born in Venice, Italy and ordained a priest in the Order of Preachers.
On 11 February 1604, he was appointed during the papacy of Pope Clement VIII as Bishop of Kotor. 
On 22 February 1604, he was consecrated bishop by Girolamo Bernerio, Cardinal-Bishop of Albano, with Agostino Quinzio, Bishop of Korčula, and Gregorio Servanzi, Bishop of Trevico, serving as co-consecrators. 
On 31 August 1611, he was appointed during the papacy of Pope Paul V as Bishop of Chioggia. He served as Bishop of Chioggia until his death in November 1612.

References

External links and additional sources
 (for Chronology of Bishops) 
 (for Chronology of Bishops) 
 (for Chronology of Bishops) 
 (for Chronology of Bishops) 

1553 births
1612 deaths
Roman Catholic bishops of Kotor
Bishops appointed by Pope Clement VIII
Bishops appointed by Pope Paul V
Montenegrin Roman Catholic bishops
17th-century Roman Catholic bishops in the Republic of Venice